The Heart of General Robert E. Lee is a 1928 MGM short silent fictionalized film short in two-color Technicolor. It was the seventh film produced as part of Metro-Goldwyn-Mayer's "Great Events" series.

Production
The film was shot at the Tec-Art Studio in Hollywood.

Preservation status
The film has been preserved in its entirety at the Library of Congress in Washington, DC. The film was, at one point, partially lost, with only the second reel surviving; the first roll was recovered in 2007.

References

External links 

1928 films
American silent short films
Metro-Goldwyn-Mayer short films
Silent films in color
American biographical films
Cultural depictions of Robert E. Lee
American Civil War films
1920s American films